JG Motorsports was a NASCAR Busch Series race team co-owned by Jeff Gordon and Rick Hendrick, which attempted 20 races in the year 2000.

The team evolved from Gordon–Evernham Motorsports, which ran six races in the Busch Series in 1999.

History

Gordon–Evernham Motorsports (1999)
In 1999, Brooke Gordon (then wife of Jeff Gordon) and Ray Evernham formed Gordon/Evernham Motorsports (GEM) to compete in that year's Busch Series season. The team's Pepsi-sponsored cars ran six races with Jeff Gordon as driver and Evernham as crew chief. DuPont sponsored the No. 24 car in two races in 1999 with driver Ricky Hendrick, with Evernham and Patrick Donahue as crew chiefs. During the season, Gordon won the Outback Steakhouse 200, the inaugural Busch Series race at Phoenix International Raceway.

Due to offers from Dodge, Evernham sold his half of GEM to Rick Hendrick at the end of the year.

JG Motorsports (2000)
The GEM cars competed in the 2000 NASCAR Busch Series under the title "JG Motorsports". The team was jointly owned by Jeff Gordon and Rick Hendrick and attempted 20 races in the year. The team ran sixteen races with Ricky Hendrick as driver and did not qualify for five of the sixteen. Pepsi stayed as sponsor for the five races Gordon drove and GMAC came on as sponsor for the races Ricky Hendrick drove. In the team's final race at Homestead-Miami Speedway, Gordon won the season finale after leading the final 71 laps.

Race statistics
(key) (Bold – Pole position awarded by qualifying time. Italics – Pole position earned by points standings or practice time. * – Most laps led.)

References

External links

 
 Jeff Gordon Online page

1999 establishments in North Carolina
2000 disestablishments in North Carolina
American auto racing teams
Defunct NASCAR teams
Jeff Gordon
Auto racing teams disestablished in 2000
Auto racing teams established in 1999